Farandole is a 1945 French comedy film directed by André Zwoboda and starring André Luguet, Lise Delamare, Gaby Morlay. It takes its title from the Farandole, a traditional dance from Provence whose structure the plot follows. It was shot at the Saint-Maurice Studios in Paris. The film's sets were designed by the art director Robert Hubert. It was filmed following the Liberation but released while the Second World War was still being fought.

Synopsis
The film is structurally similar to Arthur Schnitzler's La Ronde with a series of stories all linked together.

Cast
 André Luguet as Maxime Théric
 Lise Delamare as  Blanche
 Gaby Morlay as Elizabeth
 Paulette Dubost as Raymonde "Milienne", la prostituée
 Louis Salou as  Auguste Moine
 André Alerme as Pascal Bondieu, l'escroc
 Jany Holt as  Marianne, la dactylo qui tue la femme de son amant
 Bernard Blier as Sylvestre Clarel, l'amant
 Maurice Escande as Me Monestier, l'avocat accusateur
 Jean Davy as l'avocat de Marianne
 Gustave Gallet as le président du tribunal
 Guillaume de Sax as Brincard, le banquier véreux
 Guy Decomble as Paul Blanc, le journaliste
 Pierre Labry as  l'inspecteur Mazeau
 Alfred Adam as  "Zanzi" l'ami de Milienne

References

Bibliography
Oscherwitz,  Dayna & Higgins, MaryEllen. The A to Z of French Cinema. Scarecrow Press, 2009.

External links 
 

1945 films
French comedy films
1940s French-language films
1945 comedy films
Films directed by André Zwoboda
Films set in Paris
Films shot at Saint-Maurice Studios
Films set in Provence-Alpes-Côte d'Azur
1940s French films